Martin Privrel (born 11 April 1996) is a Slovak footballer who currently plays for 2. liga club FC Petržalka as a defender.

Club career

FK Senica
Privrel made his professional Fortuna Liga's debut for FK Senica on 6 March 2015 against MFK Košice.

References

External links
 FK Senica profile
 
 Futbalnet profile

1996 births
Living people
Slovak footballers
Association football defenders
FK Senica players
FC Petržalka players
FC Rohožník players
Slovak Super Liga players
Expatriate footballers in the Czech Republic
Expatriate footballers in Austria